Trinity Methodist Episcopal Church (now known as Knoxville House of Faith) is a historic church at 416 Lovenia Avenue in Knoxville, Tennessee, in the Fourth and Gill historic district.

It was built in 1906 and added to the National Register of Historic Places in 1982. The sanctuary features high vaulted ceilings.

The building currently houses a small Pentecostal congregation.

References

Methodist churches in Tennessee
Churches on the National Register of Historic Places in Tennessee
Gothic Revival church buildings in Tennessee
Churches completed in 1906
20th-century Methodist church buildings in the United States
Churches in Knoxville, Tennessee
National Register of Historic Places in Knoxville, Tennessee
1906 establishments in Tennessee